Towson University's College of Business and Economics has the academic departments and programs of:

Accounting
Business Analytics & Technology Management
Economics
Finance
Management
Marketing 

The college directly supports two outreach programs: the Center for Applied Business and Economic Research and the Maryland Council for Economic Education. It is housed and located in Stephens Hall on the York Road campus.

External links

College of Business and Economics - Towson University Website

Business and Economics